Nikhil Doru (born 23 January 1979) is an Indian first-class cricketer who plays for Railways. He made his first-class debut for Rajasthan in the 1999–00 Ranji Trophy on 11 November 1999.

References

External links
 

1979 births
Living people
Indian cricketers
Rajasthan cricketers